Nichola Hope and Sarah Hope (born 1985) are Welsh artists.  They have produced visual artwork documenting the Welsh National Opera and occasionally paint and draw live. Nichola was shortlisted for Wildlife Artist of the Year 2020, her watercolour Tansy Beetle was awarded the Elizabeth Hosking prize for watercolour. She was awarded the RK Burt Painting Prize and has been selected for Wales Portrait I and II, Welsh Artist of the Year in 2006 and the Royal Cambrian Academy of Art. Sarah was awarded Joint second prize winner of the Llanfairpwll Big Draw and was shortlisted for the Jerwood Drawing Prize. Collectively they have worked on international projects with Monte Carlo Opera, Melbourne Opera, Tasmanian Storytelling Festival and Los Angeles St. David's Day Festival. Together they appeared as Arts Editors for the internationally distributed Celtic Family Magazine and have featured in a number of publications.

Both of them use pen, ink, and charcoal in their work, while Nichola also has a distinct use of watercolour and oils. Sarah specializes in drawing and working from pottery casts, and has furthered this study at the Lack Atelier in Minnesota.

Early life
Nichola and Sarah Hope are sisters and were born in Cardiff, Wales.  They are of Welsh and Irish descent, and Nichola studied at Winchester School of Art and Sarah attended The Prince's Drawing School, London.

References

External links 
 Sarah Hope Website Home page
 Nichola Hope Website Home page
 Drawing the Welsh National Opera 

1975 births
Living people
20th-century Welsh women artists
21st-century Welsh women artists
Artists from Cardiff
Identical twins
People from Barry, Vale of Glamorgan
Sibling artists
Welsh twins
Welsh people of Irish descent
Welsh women painters